Current notable computer hardware manufacturers:

Cases 
List of computer case manufacturers:

 Aigo
 Antec
 AOpen
 ASRock
 Asus
 be quiet!
 CaseLabs (defunct)
 Chassis Plans
 Cooler Master
 Corsair
 Dell
 Deepcool
 DFI
 ECS
 EVGA Corporation
 Foxconn
 Fractal Design
 Gigabyte Technology
 IBall
 In Win Development
 Lian Li
 MSI
 MiTAC
 NZXT
 Phanteks
 Razer
 Rosewill
 Seasonic
 Shuttle
 SilverStone Technology
 Thermaltake
 XFX
 Zalman

Rack-mount computer cases 

 Antec
 AOpen

Laptop computer cases 
 Clevo
 MSI

Motherboards  
Top motherboard manufacturers:

 ASRock
 Asus
 Biostar
 EVGA Corporation
 Gigabyte Technology
 MSI (Micro-Star International)
 Intel

List of mainboard manufacturers:

 Acer
 ACube Systems
 Albatron
 AOpen
 Chassis Plans
 DFI (industrial motherboards), stopped producing LanParty motherboards in 2009
 ECS (Elitegroup Computer Systems)
 EPoX (partially defunct)
 First International Computer
 Foxconn
 Fujitsu
 Gumstix
 Intel (NUC and server motherboards)
 Lanner Inc (industrial motherboards)
 Leadtek
 Lite-On
 NZXT
 Pegatron
 PNY Technologies
 Powercolor
 Sapphire Technology
 Shuttle Inc.
 Simmtronics
 Supermicro
 Tyan
 VIA Technologies
 Vigor Gaming
 ZOTAC

Defunct:

 BFG Technologies
 Chaintech
 Soyo Group Inc
 Universal Abit (formerly ABIT)

Chipsets for motherboards 

 AMD
 Redpine Signals
 Intel
 Nvidia
 ServerWorks
 Silicon Integrated Systems
 VIA Technologies

Central processing units (CPUs) 
Note: most of these companies only make designs, and do not manufacture their own designs. 

Top x86 CPU manufacturers:

 AMD
 Intel

List of CPU manufacturers (most of the companies sell ARM-based CPUs, assumed if nothing else stated):

 Arm Ltd. (sells designs only)
 Apple Inc. (ARM-based CPUs)
 Broadcom Inc. (ARM-based, e.g. for Raspberry Pi)
 Fujitsu (its ARM-based CPU used in top supercomputer, still also sells its SPARC-based servers)
 Hitachi (its own designs and ARM)
 Hygon (x86-based)
 HiSilicon (acquired by Huawei), stopped making its ARM-based design
 IBM (now only designs two architectures)
 Ingenic Semiconductor (MIPS-based)
 Marvell (its ThunderX3 ARM-based)
 MCST (its own designs and SPARC)
 MediaTek (ARM chips, and MIPS chips)
 Nvidia (sells ARM-based, and unsuccessfully attempted to buy the ARM company)

 Qualcomm (ARM-based)
 Rockchip (ARM-based)
 Amlogic (ARM-based)
 Allwinner (ARM-based)
 Samsung (ARM-based)
 SiFive (RISC-V-based, e.g. HiFive Unleashed)
 Texas Instruments (its own designs and ARM)
 Via (formerly Centaur Technology division), its own x86-based design
 Wave Computing (previously MIPS Technologies), licenses MIPS CPU design 
 Zhaoxin (its own x86 design based on Via's)

Hard disk drives (HDDs)

Internal 
List of current hard disk drive manufacturers:

 Seagate Technology
 Toshiba
 Western Digital

External 
Note: the HDDs internal to these devices are manufactured only by the internal HDD manufacturers listed above.

List of external hard disk drive manufacturers:

 ADATA
 Buffalo Technology
 Freecom
 G-Technology brand of Western Digital
 Hyundai
 IoSafe-Hard drive safes
 LaCie (brand of Seagate)
 LG
 Maxtor (brand of Seagate)
 Samsung
 Seagate Technology
 Silicon Power
 Sony
 Toshiba
 Transcend Information
 TrekStor
 Verbatim Corporation
 Western Digital

Drive controller and RAID cards 

 3ware
 Adaptec
 Asus
 Areca Technology
 ATTO Technology
 Dell
 Hewlett Packard Enterprise
 Intel
 LG
 LSI
 PNY
 StarTech.com

Solid-state drives (SSDs) 

Many companies manufacture SSDs but only six companies actually manufacture the NAND flash devices that are the storage element in most SSDs.

Optical disc drives (ODDs) 
List of optical disc drive manufacturers:

 Asus 
 Hitachi-LG Data Storage (HLDS) 
 LG Electronics 
 Panasonic 
 Philips & Lite-on Digital Solutions Corporation
 Optiarc 
 Pioneer 
 Sony Corporation 
 TEAC 
 Toshiba Samsung Storage Technology

Fans 

 Aigo
 Antec
 Arctic
 be quiet!
 Corsair
 Cooler Master
 Deepcool
 Delta Electronics
 Ebm-papst
 Inventec
 Minebea (NMB)
 Nidec
 Noctua
 Razer Inc. (also bundled with AIO watercoolers)
 Thermaltake
 Zalman

Fan controllers 

 Asus (bundled with top of the range ROG motherboards)
 Cooler Master
 Corsair
 GELID Solutions
 NZXT
 Razer Inc. (external or internal)
 Thermaltake
 Zalman

Computer cooling systems 
List of computer cooling system manufacturers:

 Aigo
 AMD
 Antec
 Arctic
 Asetek
 Asus
 be quiet!
 Cooler Master
 Corsair
 Deepcool
 ebm-papst
 Fractal Design
 Foxconn
 GELID Solutions
 Gigabyte Technology
 Hama Photo
 Intel
 Nidec
 Noctua
 NZXT
 MSI
 Saint-Gobain (tubing system)
 SilverStone Technology
 Thermalright
 Thermaltake
 Vigor Gaming
 Zalman

Non-refillable liquid cooling (AiO) 
List of non-refillable liquid cooling manufacturers:

 Cooler Master "Seidon Series"
 Corsair "H-Series"
 Deepcool "CAPTAIN Series" "MAELSTROM Series"
 EKWB
 EVGA Corporation
 Fractal Design "Kelvin Series"
 Lian Li
 NZXT "Kraken Series"
 Razer Inc. "Hanbo Chroma Series"
 SilverStone Technology "Tundra Series"
 Thermaltake "Water2.0 Series"
 Zalman "SKADI series" "Reserator 3 Max" "LQ series" "Reserator 3 Max Dual"
 Zotac (stopped producing water coolers)

Refillable liquid cooling kits 
List of refillable liquid cooling kits manufacturers:

 Thermaltake

Water block 
List of water block manufacturers:

 Corsair
 EKWB
 EVGA Corporation
 Thermaltake
 Zalman

Video-card cooling 
List of graphics card cooling manufacturers:

 Arctic
 Cooler Master
 Corsair
 Deepcool "v series"
 EVGA Corporation
 GELID Solutions
 Zotac

Computer monitors 
List of companies that are actively manufacturing and selling computer monitors:

 Alienware
 Apple
 Acer
 AOC Monitors
 Asus
 AOpen
 BenQ
 Chassis Plans
 Cooler Master
 Dell
 Eizo
 Fujitsu
 Hewlett-Packard
 Iiyama (company)
 Gateway
 HannStar
 Lenovo
 LG
 MSI
 NEC
 Philips
 Planar Systems
 Razer Inc.
 Samsung
 Sharp
 Sony
 Tatung Company
 ViewSonic

Smartglasses 

 Epson
 Everysight
 Google
 Magic Leap
 Microsoft
 Snap Inc.
 Vuzix

Virtual reality headsets 

 ByteDance
 HTC
 Microsoft
 Pimax
 Razer Inc.
 Reality Labs
 Samsung Electronics
 Sony Interactive Entertainment
 Valve Corporation

Video cards (graphics cards) 
List of video card manufacturers:

 Asrock
 Asus
 AMD
 Biostar
 Chaintech
 Club 3D
 Diamond Multimedia
 ECS
 ELSA Technology
 EVGA Corporation
 Foxconn
 Gainward
 Gigabyte Technology
 HIS
 Hercules Computer Technology, Inc.
 Leadtek
 Matrox
 Moore Threads
 Nvidia
 MSI
 Palit
 PNY
 Point of View
 PowerColor
 S3 Graphics
 Sapphire Technology
 SPARKLE
 XFX
 Zotac
 BFG (defunct)
 EPoX (defunct)
 Oak Technology (defunct)
 3dfx Interactive (defunct)

Graphics processing units (GPUs) 

 Advanced Micro Devices
 ARM Holdings (Mali GPUs, first designed by acquired Falanx)
 ATI Technologies  (Acquired by Advanced Micro Devices)
 Broadcom Limited
 Imagination Technologies (PowerVR)
 Intel
 Matrox
 Moore Threads
 Nvidia
 Qualcomm
 Via (S3 Graphics division)
 Vivante Corporation
 ZiiLABS
 Tseng Labs(acquired by ATI)
 XGI
 3dfx Interactive (Bankrupt)

Keyboards 
List of keyboard manufacturers:

 A4Tech
 Alps
 Amkette
 Arctic
 Behavior Tech Computer (BTC)
 Chassis Plans
 Cherry
 Chicony Electronics
 Corsair
 Cooler Master
 CTI Electronics Corporation
 Das Keyboard
 Fujitsu–Siemens
 Gigabyte Technology
 G.Skill
 Hama Photo
 HyperX
 IBall
 intex
 Kensington Computer Products Group
 Key Tronic
 Lite-On
 Logitech
 Microsoft
 Razer
 Saitek
 Samsung
 SteelSeries
 Targus
 Terabyte
 Thermaltake
 Trust
 Umax
 Unicomp
 Happy Hacking Keyboard
 Drop (company)

Mouse 
List of mouse manufacturers:

 A4Tech
 Acer
 Alienware
 Arctic
 Asus
 Behavior Tech Computer (BTC)
 Belkin
 Cooler Master
 Corsair
 Creative Technology
 CTI Electronics Corporation
 Fellowes, Inc.
 Flextronics
 General Electric
 Gigabyte Technology
 Hama Photo
 IBall
 intex
 TVS Electronics
 Kensington Computer Products Group
 Key Tronic
 Labtec
 Lite-On
 Logitech
 Mad Catz
 Microsoft
 Mitsumi
 OCZ Technology
 Razer
 Saitek
 Samsung 
 SilverStone Technology
 Sony
 SteelSeries
 Targus
 Terabyte
 Toshiba
 Trust
 Umax
 Verbatim Corporation
 Zalman

Vsg

Mouse pads 
List of mouse pad manufacturers:

 A4Tech
 Acer
 Alienware
 Corsair
 Logitech
 Razer
 SteelSeries
 Targus
 Trust
 Verbatim Corporation

Joysticks 
List of Joystick manufacturers:

 Saitek
 Logitech
 CTI Electronics Corporation
 Microsoft
 Thrustmaster
 Sony

Speakers 
List of computer speaker manufacturers:

 Altec Lansing
 AOpen (stopped making speakers)
 Auzentech
 Behringer
 Bose Corporation
 Cemex
 Cerwin-Vega
 Corsair
 Creative Technology
 Edifier
 General Electric
 Gigabyte Technology
 Hama Photo
 Harman International Industries (acquisition)
(division: Harman Kardon, JBL)
 Hercules
 IBall
 Intex
 Klipsch
 Logic
 Logitech
 M-Audio
 MartinLogan
 Philips
 Plantronics (acquisitions)
 Razer
 Shuttle Inc.
 Sonodyne
 Sony
 SteelSeries
 Teufel
 Trust
 Yamaha

Modems 
List of modem manufacturers:

 3Com
 Agere Systems
 Alcatel
 Aopen
 Arris Group
 Asus
 AVM GmbH
 Belkin International, Inc.
 Coolpad
 D-Link
 Cisco
 Huawei
 JCG
 Linksys
 Microcom
 Motorola
 Netgear
 Netopia
 Telebit
 TP-Link
 USRobotics
 Zhone Technologies
 Zoom Telephonics
 ZyXEL

Network interface cards (NICs) 
List of network card manufacturers:

 3Com
 Asus
 Atheros
 Belkin
 Chelsio Communications
 Cisco
 CNet
 D-Link
 Gigabyte Technology
 Hewlett Packard Enterprise
 IBM
 Intel
 JCG
 Linksys
 Ralink
 Mellanox
 Netgear
 Raza Microelectronics
 Solarflare
 StarTech.com
 TP-Link
 USRobotics
 Zoom

Chipsets for network cards 

 ASIX
 Atheros
 Aquantia
 Broadcom
 Emulex
 Fujitsu
 Hewlett Packard Enterprise
 Intel
 LSI Corporation
 Nvidia
 Marvell Technology Group
 Mellanox
 Proxim
 Qlogic
 Qualcomm
 Ralink
 Realtek
 Solarflare
 VIA Technologies
 Winbond

There are a number of other companies (AMD, Microchip, Altera, etc) making specialized chipsets as part of other ICs, and they are not often found in PC hardware (laptop, desktop or server). There are also a number of now defunct companies (like 3com, DEC, SGI) that produced network related chipsets for us in general computers.

Power supply units (PSUs) 
List of power supply unit (PSU) manufacturers:

 ADATA
 Antec
 Arctic
 be quiet!
 Cooler Master
 Corsair
 Deepcool
 Delta Electronics
 Dynex
 EVGA Corporation
 Fractal Design
 Foxconn
 FSP Group
 Gigabyte Technology
 Lian-Li
 Lite-On
 Maplin
 NZXT
 OCZ Technology
 PC Power and Cooling
 Razer Inc.
 Seasonic
 Seventeam
 SilverStone
 StarTech.com
 Super Flower
 Thermaltake
 Trust
 XFX
 Xilence
 Zalman

Random-access memory (RAM) modules 
Note that the actual memory chips are manufactured by a small number of DRAM manufacturers. List of memory module manufacturers:

 ADATA
 Apacer
 Asus
 Axiom
 Buffalo Technology
 Chaintech
 Corsair
 Dataram
 Fujitsu
 G.Skill
 GeIL
 HyperX
 IBM
 Infineon
 Kingston Technology
 Lenovo
 Crucial
 Mushkin
 Netlist
 PNY
 Rambus
 Ramtron International
 Rendition
 Renesas Technology
 Samsung Semiconductor
 Sandisk
 Sea Sonic
 SK Hynix
 Silicon Power
 Toshiba
 Transcend
 Virtium
 Wilk Elektronik
 Winbond
 Wintec Industries Inc.

Random-access memory (RAM) chips 
List of current DRAM manufacturers:

 Micron Technology
 Samsung Semiconductor
 SK hynix
 ChangXin Memory Technologies
 Nanya Technology
 Powerchip Semiconductor (as a foundry)
 Winbond (specialty and mobile DRAM)

List of former or defunct DRAM manufacturers:

 NEC, Hitachi, later Elpida Memory (went bankrupt, bought by Micron)
 Mitsubishi, later Elpida
 Siemens, spun off Infineon Technologies, spun off Qimonda (went bankrupt, IP bought by Micron and others)
 Inotera, bought by Micron
 Intel (Intel 1103)
 Mostek
 Mosel Vitelic Inc (ProMOS Technologies spun off from Mosel Vitelic)
 Toshiba (DRAM business sold to Micron)
 Vanguard International Semiconductor Corporation

List of fabless DRAM companies:

 Rambus 

In addition, other semiconductor manufacturers include SRAM or eDRAM embedded in larger chips.

Headphones 
List of headphone manufacturers:

 AKG Acoustics
 Altec Lansing
 Amkette
 Andrea Electronics
 Asus
 Audio-Technica
 Beats Electronics
 Beyerdynamic
 Biostar
 Bose Corporation
 Bush (brand)
 Corsair
 Creative Technology
 Edifier
 Fostex
 Grado Labs
 Hercules
 HiFiMan
 IHome
 JBL
 JLab Audio
 JVC (brand of JVCKenwood)
 Klipsch Audio Technologies
 Koss Corporation
 Meze Headphones
 Microsoft
 Monster Cable
 Panasonic
 Philips
 Plantronics
 Plantronics Gamecom
 Razer
 Roccat
 Samsung 
 Sennheiser
 Shure
 Skullcandy
 SMS Audio
 Sonodyne
 Sony
 Stax Earspeakers
 SteelSeries
 Thermaltake
 Technics (brand)
 Thinksound
 Thrustmaster
 Turtle Beach Systems
 Ultrasone
 V-Moda
 Yamaha

Image scanners 
List of image scanner manufacturers:

 Brother
 Canon
 Fujitsu
 Kodak
 Lexmark
 Microtek
 Mustek Systems
 Panasonic
 Plustek
 Ricoh
 Seiko Epson
 Umax
 Visioneer
 XEROX

Sound cards 
List of sound card manufacturers:

 Ad Lib, Inc.
 Gravis
 Analog Devices
 Asus
 Aureal Semiconductor
 Auzentech
 C-Media
 Conrad
 Creative Technology
 Diamond Multimedia
 Avid Audio
 E-MU Systems
 Ensoniq
 ESS Technology
 Focusrite
 Hercules
 HT Omega
 Korg
 Lexicon
 M-Audio
 MOTU
 PreSonus
 Razer
 Realtek
 Roland
 Speedlink
 StarTech.com
 Silicon Integrated Systems
 TerraTec
 Turtle Beach
 VIA Technologies
 Yamaha

TV tuner cards 
List of TV tuner card manufacturers:

 AVerMedia
 Asus
 Diamond Multimedia
 EVGA Corporation
 EyeTV
 Gigabyte Technology
 Hauppauge Computer Works
 KWorld
 Leadtek
 Micro-Star International
 Pinnacle Systems
 Plextor
 Powercolor
 TerraTec
 Umax

USB flash drives 
List of USB flash drive manufacturers:

 ADATA
 Aigo
 Apacer
 ATP Electronics
 Corsair
 Crucial Technology
 Imation
 IronKey
 Kingston Technology
 Konami
 Lexar
 Maxell
 Netac
 OCZ
 PNY
 Quantum Corporation
 Ritek
 Samsung
 SanDisk
 Seagate
 Silicon Power
 Sony
 Strontium Technology
 Toshiba
 Transcend
 TrekStor
 Umax
 Verbatim
 VisiOn
 Wilk Elektronik

Webcams 
List of webcam manufacturers:

 A4Tech
 Behavior Tech Computer
 Canon
 Creative Technology
 D-Link
 FaceVsion
 General Electric
 Hama Photo
 Hewlett-Packard
 Intel
 Labtec
 Lenovo
 Logitech
 Kodak
 Microsoft
 Philips
 Razer Inc.
 Samsung 
 Silicon Power
 Trust
 TP-Link

Gaming chair 
List of gaming chair manufacturers:
Corsair
Herman Miller x Logitech
Razer
Secretlab

See also
 List of computer system manufacturers
 List of laptop brands and manufacturers
 List of flash memory controller manufacturers
 List of solid-state drive manufacturers
 Market share of personal computer vendors
List of computer hardware manufacturers in the Soviet Union

References

 
Computing-related lists
Lists of information technology companies
Lists of manufacturers